Kramer Electronics is an Information and communications technology company that designs, manufactures and distributes network-based devices and networking cables for professional video over IP and audio over IP. Products are commonly used for Video Conferencing, Education Technology and Closed-circuit television. Customers' include commercial enterprises and institutions such as universities, courts and local authorities. Kramer devices facilitate online control and enable hybrid (mixed local and remote) and BYOD (bring your own device) use cases. 
Kramer were wholly owned and managed by founder Joseph Kramer until 2021, when they were bought by the Israeli private equity fund Fortissimo Capital.

History 
Kramer Electronics was founded in 1981 by Joseph Kramer, who has a PhD in pharmaceutical biology and was working in research and development at a company that manufactured headphones. 
His employer went out of business and Kramer foresaw the significance of video, then in its infancy, and used his previous employer's distribution channels to start selling video products of his own design.

Acquisition of Sierra Video 

In 2003, Kramer Electronics bought Sierra Video, a company that manufactures Broadcast Routing equipment which expanded the Kramer product offering into large format routing products for composite video, RGBHV video and SDI and HD-SDI signals as well as audio signals.

Acquisition of UC Workspace 
In February 2022, it was announced Kramer has acquired the hybrid collaboration meeting room application provider, UC Workspace.

Awards 
 2020: SCN Product of the Year Award for the Kramer Spider 
 2020: rAVe Reader’s Choice Awards: Favorite Manufacturer Technical Support Team.
 2020: Commercial Integrator BEST of 2020 Awards: Kramer's Omnivore KM-2B, and K-Spider.
 2020: SCN Most Innovative AV installation Accessory: Kramer Electronics' "K-Spider".
 2020: rAVe Reader's Choice of the Year: Favorite Support Team.
 2019: ISE - AV accessory of the year for Kramer’s AD-RING-5.
 2019: ISE - AV Technology Europe’s Best of Show award for Kramer’s 240W networked power amplifier.
 2019: InfoComm - rAVe’s Best ProAV Control System Interface award for Kramer BRAINware controller software. 
 2019: InfoComm - AV Technology's Best of Show award for Kramer's VS-34FD 8K-ready modular matrix switcher.
 2018: InstallAwards - AV Accessory of the Year for Kramer’s 860 Signal Generator and Analyzer.
 2018: InfoComm - Sound & Video Contractor’s Best of Show award for the Kramer VS-622DT all-in-one presentation system with room automation.
 2018: InfoComm - Installation's Best of Show award for the Kramer PA-240Z high-performance and controllable power amplifier.
 2018: InfoComm - AV Technology's Best of Show award for the VIA Connect PLUS (wired and wireless presentation and collaboration solution).
 2018: ISE - rAVe's award for Best New Video Interface for Kramer's DGKat 2.0 technology.
 2017: InstallAwards - Installation Magazine's Lifetime Achievement Award for founder Dr. Joseph Kramer. 
 2017: InAVation Technology Award for "Small Group Presentation (less than 20 people)" for VIA Go  
 2017: InfoComm - Tech & Learning Best of Show for KN-DSP100, the first audio DSP over IP.
 2017: Installation Magazine Best of show for Kramer AOCH/60 fiber optic HDMI cables. 
 2017: ISE - AV Technology Best of Show award for Kramer Video Content Overlay (VCO).
 2016: XLIVE Awards - New Product Award - Video for Kramer’s VP-734 Presentation Switcher/4K30 UHD Scaler.
 2016: InfoAV China's Best of Show award - Kramer Network and Enterprise Platform for AV management.
 2016: ISE Installation Magazine Best of Show - Kramer Network Virtual AV Services.
 2016: Tech & Learning Magazine’s Annual Award of Excellence for Kramer’s VIA Campus. 
 2016: InfoComm - Government Video Magazine Best of Show for Kramer Control.
 2016: ISE - InAVation Award for K-Touch 3 (room control solution).
 2015: ISE - InAVation Award for Kramer VIA Collage in the Collaboration category.
 2015: ISE - Installation Magazine’s Best of Show for Kramer VIA Collage.
 2014: InfoComm cable challenge, Kramer wins independent 4K HDBaseT Category.
 2014: InAVation award for a Video Processing or Distribution Product won by the VP−771. 
 2013: InfoComm honors founder Dr. Joseph Kramer with the Adele De Berri Pioneer of AV Award.
 2013: AV Awards - Manufacturer of the year and systems product of the year 2013, with the VP−771 switcher/scaler
 2012: AV Awards - Systems Product of the Year.

References 

Electronics companies of Israel
Electronics companies established in 1981